Issé is an operatic pastorale héroïque by the French composer André Cardinal Destouches. Initially it was in three acts. The definitive revised version consists of a prologue and five acts. The libretto was by Antoine Houdar de la Motte. Although Destouches was only 25 at the time of its premiere, it is considered his best score.

Performance history
Issé was first performed in a concert version without a prologue in the Salle de la Belle-Cheminée at the Palace of Fontainebleau on 7 October 1697. At the request of Louis XIV, a prologue was added for the official premiere, a concert performance on 17 December at the Trianon (Versailles) for the festivities surrounding the marriage of Princess Marie Adélaïde of Savoy to Louis' grandson, the Duke of Burgundy, to whom Issé was dedicated. Louis XIV was so pleased with the work after its performance at the Trianon, that he gave Destouches a purse containing 200 louis. The first full staging by the Paris Opera (with the prologue and three acts) was on 30 December 1697 at the Théâtre du Palais-Royal in Paris. Destouches revised it in a grander five-act form for its revival at the Palais-Royal on 14 October 1708. Issé was so successful, it remained in the repertory there until 1757. It was also given again a number of times at the court up to 1773. Madame de Pompadour sang the title role for a production in the Théâtre des Petits Cabinets at the Palace of Versailles in 1749.

Roles

Synopsis
Apollon (Apollo), disguised as a shepherd called Philémon, pursues the nymph Issé, while Pan takes an interest in Doris.

Discography

References
Notes

References

Sources
 Pitou, Spire (1983–1990). The Paris Opéra: An Encyclopedia of Operas, Ballets, Composers, and Performers (3 volumes). Westport, Connecticut: Greenwood Press. .
 Wood, Caroline (1992), "Issé" in The New Grove Dictionary of Opera, vol. 2, p. 833, ed. Stanley Sadie (London)

External links

French-language operas
Opéras-ballets
1697 operas
Operas by André Cardinal Destouches
Music dedicated to nobility or royalty
Operas